Brest Pokupski is a village in Banovina region of Croatia. The settlement is administratively located in the Town of Petrinja and the Sisak-Moslavina County. According to the 2011 census it has 279 inhabitants. It is connected by the D30 state road. The village was damaged to a notable extent in the 2020 Petrinja earthquake and the subsequent shaking. Some of the damage was caused by soil liquefaction, a rare phenomenon observed for the first time in Croatia since the 1880 Zagreb earthquake.

Sources

Populated places in Sisak-Moslavina County